Right Now: Live at the Jazz Workshop is a live album by the jazz bassist and composer Charles Mingus, recorded in San Francisco in 1964 and released on the Fantasy label in 1966.

Reception
The AllMusic review by Scott Yanow stated: "Although not up to the passionate level of the Mingus-Dolphy Quintet, this underrated unit holds its own".

Track listing
All compositions by Charles Mingus
 "New Fables" - 23:18  
 "Meditation (for a Pair of Wire Cutters)" - 23:44  
Recorded at the Jazz Workshop in San Francisco, California, on June 2 & 3, 1964

Personnel
Charles Mingus - bass
John Handy - alto saxophone (track 1)
Clifford Jordan - tenor saxophone 
Jane Getz - piano
Dannie Richmond - drums

References

Charles Mingus live albums
1964 live albums
Fantasy Records live albums
Albums recorded at the Jazz Workshop